Tinacrusis sebasta is a species of moth of the family Tortricidae. It is found in Guatemala and Mexico (Chiapas, Veracruz).

References

Moths described in 1914
Atteriini
Moths of North America